792 Naval Air Squadron (792 NAS) was a Naval Air Squadron of the Royal Navy's Fleet Air Arm and was originally formed at RNAS St Merryn (HMS Vulture) in August 1939 as an Air Target Unit, equipped with six Blackburn Skuas. The squadron disbanded in 1945 and merged with 794 Naval Air Squadron. 792 Squadron reformed at RNAS Culdrose in 1948 as a Night Fighter Training Unit. It was initially equipped with Fairey Firefly NF.1s and Avro Ansons. They were later replaced with Sea Hornets shortly before the squadron disbanded again in August 1950.

The squadron was reformed at RNAS Culdrose (HMS Seahawk) in November 2001 from the Fleet Target Group from RNAS Portland, which closed in 1998. It operated the Mirach 100/5 unmanned subsonic drones which were used to test the Sea Dart Missile System on Type 42 destroyers and Sidewinder missiles on Harrier and Tornado fighters. It is not listed on the current Royal Navy website and is believed to have been replaced by QinetiQ's Combined Aerial Target Service contract.

References

Bibliography
 

700 series Fleet Air Arm squadrons
Military units and formations of the Royal Navy in World War II
Military of the United Kingdom in Cornwall